Neuburg Air Base is a military air base in Germany. It is located in the district of Neuburg on the Danube, approximately 20 km west-southwest of Ingolstadt.  Its primary user is Jagdgeschwader 74 (JG 74 for short, Fighter Wing 74 in English) of the German Air Force (Luftwaffe), which provides air defence for Southern Germany. Since 2006 Eurofighter Typhoons have been operated from the base.  Although Neuburg is the smallest fighter aircraft base in the Bundeswehr, the air base was virtually unaffected by the Bundeswehr reform announced in 2011.

History

The history of military aviation in Neuburg dates back to the year 1912, when a military aircraft landed in the drill square in Neuburg for the first time.

In 1935 construction of the base started.  In 1937, the base was designated as the "Aviation Weapons School".  It was equipped with Dornier Do 23's, Focke-Wulf Fw 56's, and Junkers Ju 52's.  Close to the end of World War II, Neuburg also served as a base and construction facility for the jet-driven Me 262 fighter aircraft.  On March 19, 1945, the Neuburg jet plant itself was bombed by B-24 Liberators of the USAAF 392d Bombardment Group.  After being taken by the Americans, the airfield received the Allied Code designation R-60.

References

Luftwaffe bases
Neuburg an der Donau
Bases of the German Air Force
Airports in Bavaria